Dong Charoen is a district (amphoe) in the southeastern part of Phichit province, central Thailand.

Geography
Neighboring districts are (from the west clockwise) Bang Mun Nak and Thap Khlo of Phichit Province, Chon Daen of Phetchabun province and Nong Bua of Nakhon Sawan province.

History
The minor district (king amphoe) was established on 15 July 1996 by splitting off five tambons from Bang Mun Nak district.

The Thai government on 15 May 2007 upgraded all 81 minor districts to full districts. On 24 August the upgrade became official.

Administration
The district is divided into five sub-districts (tambons), which are further subdivided into 54 villages (mubans). The township (thesaban tambon) Samnak Khun Nen covers parts of tambon Samnak Khun Nen. There are a further five tambon administrative organizations (TAO).

References

External links
amphoe.com

Dong Charoen